Norsketinden is a mountain in the Stauning Alps, Eastern Greenland.

Geography
Norsketinden is one of the highest mountains in the range. It rises roughly 12 km to the east of the shore of the Alpefjord —a branch of the Segelsällskapet Fjord, between the Vikingebrae and the Gully Glacier.

Climbing history
Norsketinden was first climbed by a Danish–Norwegian expedition on 7 August 1954. The names 'Erik Rødes Tinde' or 'Eirik Raudes Tinde' —after Erik the Red, were proposed, but the peak was finally named Norsketinden.

See also
List of mountain peaks of Greenland

References

External links
Caledonian orogen of East Greenland 70°N–82°N 

Stauning Alps
Mountains of Greenland